List of West German films of 1958. Feature films produced and distributed in West Germany in 1958.

A–Z

Bibliography 
 Davidson, John & Hake, Sabine. Framing the Fifties: Cinema in a Divided Germany. Berghahn Books, 2007.
Fehrenbach, Heide. Cinema in Democratizing Germany: Reconstructing National Identity After Hitler. University of North Carolina Press, 1995.

See also
 List of Austrian films of 1958
 List of East German films of 1958

External links 
filmportal.de listing for films made in 1958

West German
Lists of German films
film